Zolof the Rock & Roll Destroyer (often referred to as simply Zolof) is an American pop rock band that originated in Philadelphia, Pennsylvania through core members Vince Ratti and Rachel Minton alongside Anthony Green. Their music, defined by the band members as "spunk rock", is heavily structured and influenced by pop music by way of catchy rhythms and bright lyrics.

The band competed in 2006's Mountain Dew Circuit Breakout challenge on MTV2, but was beaten by California band Halifax.

Discography
Zolof the Rock and Roll Destroyer (LP) (2002)
Jalopy Go Far (LP) (2003)
The Popsicle EP (EP) (2004)
Unicorns, Demos, B-Sides, And Rainbows (Self Released) (2005)
"Set the Ray to Jerry"
Set the Ray to Jerry - Single (2005) iTunes Music Store exclusive
The Killer in You (2006) The Smashing Pumpkins tribute compilation
Duet All Night Long (Split with Reel Big Fish) (2007)
Schematics (2007)
Up End Atom A tribute compilation to Atom & His Package (2009)Untitled Fourth Album''

References

External links
 Official artist website
 Zolof at MySpace
 Zolof & The Rock & Roll Destroyer at PureVolume
 Interview with Evan Greenblo for PunkNews.org
 Blender Magazine Show Review
Zolof The Rock and Roll Destroyer on AbsolutePunk.net
 Interview With AbsolutePunk.net

Indie rock musical groups from Pennsylvania
Musical groups from Philadelphia